Lost in Worship is the first studio album by Fusebox. Elevate Records alongside Inpop Records released the album on February 26, 2002.

Critical reception

Awarding the album three stars for Christianity Today, Russ Breimeier writes, "Fusebox manages to stand apart in the glutted modern-worship-band market … but perhaps not for the reasons they'd like." Kevin Breuner, giving the album a B at CCM Magazine, states, "Those seeking to add more modern praise & worship music to their collection will enjoy Lost in Worship." Rating the album a six out of ten from Cross Rhythms, Trevor Kirk says, "A promising debut". John DiBiase, indicating in a three and a half star review by Jesus Freak Hideout, describes, "A good debut with joyful worship tunes to take the listener to a higher place". Signaling in a three out of five review for The Phantom Tollbooth, Zik Jackson writes, "Lost in Worship is a passionate, heartfelt collection of both new and familiar tunes."

Track listing

References

2002 debut albums
Inpop Records albums